Allapattah station is a Metrorail station in the Allapattah neighborhood of Miami, Florida.

This station is located near the intersection of Northwest 12th Avenue (State Road 933) and 36 Street/US 27 (SR 25). It was opened to service December 17, 1984.  This is the northernmost Metrorail station within the Miami city limits.

Station layout
The station has two tracks served by an island platform.

Places of interest
Wynwood and Design District (one mile due east via Metrobus)

References

External links

MDT – Metrorail Stations
 11th Place entrance from Google Maps Street View

1984 establishments in Florida
Allapattah
Green Line (Metrorail)
Metrorail (Miami-Dade County) stations in Miami
Orange Line (Metrorail)
Railway stations in the United States opened in 1984